Grevillea angustiloba, commonly known as dissected holly-leaf grevillea, is a species of flowering plant in the family Proteaceae and is endemic to southern continental Australia. It is a prostrate, low-lying or erect shrub with deeply divided pinnate leaves and usually red, sometimes orange or pale yellow flowers.

Description

Taxonomy
Dissected holly-leaf grevillea was first formally described in 1868 by Ferdinand von Mueller, who gave it the name Grevillea ilicifolia var. angustiloba in his Fragmenta Phytographiae Australiae.

In 2004, Trisha L. Downing, Marco Duretto and Pauline Ladiges raised the variety to species status as G. angustiloba and described two subspecies in Australian Systematic Botany, and the names of the subspecies are accepted by the Australian Plant Census:
G. angustiloba (F.Muell.)

Distribution and habitat
Grevillea angustiloba grows in mallee scrub, heath and Melaleuca uncinata communities mainly in the Little Desert region of western Victoria and in south-eastern South Australia.

References

angustiloba
Proteales of Australia
Flora of South Australia
Flora of Victoria (Australia)
Taxa named by Ferdinand von Mueller
Plants described in 1868